The Assam leaf turtle (Cyclemys gemeli) is a species of turtle in the family Geoemydidae. The species is found in India, Nepal, Bhutan, and Bangladesh.

Etymology
The specific name, gemeli, is in honor of Austrian herpetologist Richard Gemel (born 1948).

Description
The carapace of C. gemeli lacks patterns in adults. It is elongated and relatively flat, with nearly parallel sides. The plastron is unpatterned and dark brown. The head is brown, and the throat and neck are uniformly dark. The bridge is also dark brown.

Geographic range
The Assam leaf turtle can be found in northeastern India, Nepal, Bhutan, and Bangladesh. Its range might extend into Myanmar.

See also
Cyclemys

References

Cyclemys
Turtles of Asia
Reptiles of Bangladesh
Reptiles of Bhutan
Reptiles of India
Reptiles of Nepal
Reptiles described in 2008